
Year 7 BC was a common year starting on Saturday or Sunday (link will display the full calendar) of the Julian calendar (the sources differ, see leap year error for further information) and a common year starting on Thursday of the Proleptic Julian calendar. In the Roman world, it was known as the Year of the Consulship of Nero and Piso (or, less frequently, year 747 Ab urbe condita). The denomination 7 BC for this year has been used since the early medieval period, when the Anno Domini calendar era became the prevalent method in Europe for naming years.

Events

By place

Roman Empire 
 Tiberius Claudius Nero and Gnaeus Calpurnius Piso are Roman Consuls.
 Augustus' second census of the Roman Empire reports a total of 4,233,000 citizens.

Births 
 Possible birthdate of Jesus, according to appearance of a very bright triple conjunction of the royal star Jupiter and Saturn in the sign of Pisces (land in the west) in May until December of that year since 854 years, with a retrogradation and stationing in November 12, 7 BC.

Deaths 
 April 17 – Cheng, Chinese emperor of the Han Dynasty (b. 51 BC)
 Aristobulus IV, Jewish prince of Judea (b. 31 BC)
 Dionysius of Halicarnassus, Greek historian (approximate date)
 Geumwa of Dongbuyeo, Korean king
 Zhao Hede, Chinese consort of the Han Dynasty

References